Eldorado, Zimbabwe is a settlement in Mashonaland West province in Zimbabwe.

Populated places in Mashonaland West Province